5051 Drysllwyn Castle is a Great Western Railway (GWR) Castle Class locomotive built at Swindon Works in May 1936 and named after Dryslwyn Castle. It is owned by the Didcot Railway Centre.

Service Life

5051 was built at Swindon Works in May 1936 and was named after Drysllwyn Castle, carrying this name for the first 18 months of its working life before being renamed to Earl Bathurst in August 1937 (the name coming from a de-named Dukedog Class No. 3208/9008). It would carry this name for the rest of its Great Western and British Railways working career. Its original name would later be applied to classmate No. 7018.

It was first allocated to Landore depot in Swansea and remained there until June of 1961, when it was transferred to Neath (shed code 87A). It was transferred to Llanelly (87F) in February 1963 and remained there until withdrawal in May that same year, having run 1,300,000 miles. It was later sold to Woodham Brothers in Oct of the same year.

Preservation

5051 remained in the scrapyard until March 1969, when it was purchased by John Mynors and sold to the  Great Western Society at Didcot Railway Centre for restoration. It was restored to steam in 1979 and was reunited with its original Drysllwyn Castle nameplates. It was regularly steamed during the 150th anniversary celebrations of the Great Western Railway in 1985.

It returned to steam in 1998 following an overhaul at Didcot and it was later returned to mainline service. On one occasion in the summer of 2003, it stood in for No. 7802 Bradley Manor working the Torbay Express, promoted by Past-Time Rail (7802 was booked to work the trains from Bristol Temple Meads to Kingswear and return, but on the first train of the season Bradley Manor developed a hot axle box and was unable to haul the next two outings, which saw 5051 take the Manor's place). Being faster than 7802 (which could only run at 60 mph, compared to 75 mph for 5051), it managed to keep to the timetable without any issues. 7802 later returned for the 31 August and 7 September trips.

It ran for most of its preserved life in lined GWR green with the letters GW on its tender. Prior to withdrawal, it was painted in BR lined green with the early emblem on its tender. Its boiler ticket later expired in 2008. At present, 5051 remains a static display.  

In preservation, it has run with both Collett and Hawksworth tenders; it was initially paired with a Collett tender following its restoration from scrapyard condition in the 1970s, and briefly used a Churchward tender following its overhaul in 1998. It was later paired with a Hawksworth tender, which it used for its previous boiler ticket. It has now once again been paired with a Collett tender while on display in the Great Western Society's engine shed at Didcot.

Gallery

References

External links

 'Castle' class details, 5050 - 5099 Great Western Archive
 The Devonian Steam Train Galleries

5051
Railway locomotives introduced in 1936
5051
Locomotives saved from Woodham Brothers scrapyard
Standard gauge steam locomotives of Great Britain